The 1996 United States Senate election in Iowa was held on November 5, 1996. Incumbent Democratic U.S. Senator Tom Harkin sought re-election to a third term in office, and he was challenged by U.S. Congressman Jim Ross Lightfoot from Iowa's 3rd congressional district. Lightfoot had won the Republican primary against two opponents, while Harkin had won his primary uncontested, so both moved on to the general election, where they engaged in a toughly fought campaign. Ultimately, Harkin was successful in his bid and defeated Lightfoot, albeit by the thinnest margin of his career.

Democratic primary

Candidates
 Tom Harkin, incumbent United States Senator

Results

Republican primary

Candidates
 Jim Ross Lightfoot, United States Representative
 Maggie Tinsman, State Senator
 Steve Grubbs, State Representative

Results

General election

Results

See also 
 1996 United States Senate elections

References 

Iowa
1996
1996 Iowa elections